Łukasz Jóźwiak (born 1985) is a Polish ice dancer. His former partner was Paulina Urban. They were coached by  Maria Olszewska-Lelonkiewicz.

He will take part in the Polish television show Gwiazdy Tańczą na Lodzie with skating partner Ewa Sonnet.

Competitive highlights

References

Living people
Polish male ice dancers
1985 births
Place of birth missing (living people)